Protopapas (Πρωτόπαπας) is a Greek surname, derived from the ecclesiastical office of protopapas. The female form is Protopapa (Πρωτόπαπα). People with the name include:

 Kostis Protopapas, Greek-American conductor
 Maria Protopapa (born 1971), Greek runner
 Vangelis Protopapas (1917–1995), Greek actor

Greek-language surnames